Herbert Charles Amey (25 November 1924 – 6 January 2003) was an Australian rules footballer who played for the Hawthorn Football Club in the Victorian Football League (VFL).

Notes

External links 

1924 births
2003 deaths
Australian rules footballers from Melbourne
Hawthorn Football Club players
People from Hawthorn, Victoria